Sparisoma chrysopterum (common names: redtail parrotfish, blue parrotfish, kwab, pink kwab, pink parrot, blisterside, and blue black-finned chub) is a species of parrotfish.

Description
The upper end of the pectoral fin base shows black saddle-shaped markings while they are young adults. Commonly, there is a light, saddle-shaped area on top of caudal peduncle. The dorsal, pelvic, and anal fins are orange or red in colour.

Juvenile specimens or those in the initial phase have a mottled pattern similar to the substratum. This provides camouflage when they rest on the sea floor.

Distribution
This species lives in the western Atlantic Ocean from Brazil in the south, north to Florida and the Bahamas. It also occurs throughout the Caribbean Sea.

Diet
Sparisoma chrysopterum This species grazes on seagrasses and algae growing in the benthic zone.

Parasites
This species is known to host an ectoparasite in the genus Caligus named Caligus atromaculatus (C.B. Wilson, 1913).

Species description and taxonomy
Sparisoma chrysopterum was first described as Scarus chrysopterus in 1801 by the German naturalists Marcus Elieser Bloch (1723-1799) and Johann Gottlob Theaenus Schneider (1750-1822) with the type locality given as "tropical western Atlantic". When William John Swainson described the genus Sparisoma in 1839 he designated Sparus abildgaardi as its type species, Although the specific name abildgaardi would appear to have precedence over chrysopterum, the latter is the more widely used name and the former was long mistakenly thought to be synonymous with Sparisoma viride. The name Sparus abildgaardi was suppressed by the International Commission on Zoological Nomenclature and Scarus chrysopterus was recognised as the type species.

References

External links
 

chrysopterum
Fish of the Atlantic Ocean
Fish of the Dominican Republic
Taxa named by Marcus Elieser Bloch
Taxa named by Johann Gottlob Theaenus Schneider
Fish described in 1801